Orion Application Server is a Java EE application server developed by Swedish company IronFlare AB, founded by Magnus Stenman and Karl Avedal. First released in 1999, Orion claims to be the first commercially available application server with full Java EE support. The current stable version is 2.0.7 which is compliant with Java EE version 1.3.

Oracle Corporation acquired license to the source of Orion in 2001, and developed it as Oracle Application Server Containers for Java EE (OC4J). OC4J and some of its documentation contains reference to the Orion server. Orion developers were involved in maintenance and enhancements of the source for Oracle.

IronFlare became an official Java EE licensee in 2003, which enabled them to access the Sun Microsystems compatibility testing tools to ensure correct implementation of the Java EE specification by Orion.

Orion is the only product of IronFlare, hence Orion has been marketed more than the company itself.

Version history
 1.5.4, February 2002
 1.6.0, July 2002
 2.0, March 2003
 2.0.1, April 2003
 2.0.2, June 2003
 2.0.3, May 2004
 2.0.4, November 2004
 2.0.5, November 2004
 2.0.6, February 2005
 2.0.7, March 2006 (stable release)
 2.0.8 (experimental build)

References

 https://web.archive.org/web/20070723181214/http://forums.orionserver.com/viewlist.jsp?name=orion-announce-interest&first=484
 https://web.archive.org/web/20090330131027/http://forums.orionserver.com/

External links
 Oracle licences Orion Server

Java enterprise platform
Oracle Application Server
Oracle software